The following is a list of Eastern Washington Eagles football seasons.

Seasons

References

Eastern Washington

Eastern Washington Eagles football seasons